is a passenger railway station located in the city of Matsusaka,  Mie Prefecture, Japan, operated by the private railway operator Kintetsu Railway.

Lines
Koishiro Station is served by the Yamada Line, and is located 15.8 rail kilometers from the starting point of the line at Ise-Nakagawa Station.

Station layout
The station consists of two opposed side platforms connected by a level crossing. The station is unattended.

Platforms

Adjacent stations

History
Koishiro Station opened on October 23, 1943 as a station on the Kansai Express Railway's Yamada Line. This line was merged with the Nankai Electric Railway on June 1, 1944 to form Kintetsu. The station has been unattended since February 21, 2005.

Passenger statistics
In fiscal 2019, the station was used by an average of 189 passengers daily (boarding passengers only).

Surrounding area
Matsusaka City Koshiro Elementary School

See also
List of railway stations in Japan

References

External links

 Kintetsu: Koishiro Station

Railway stations in Japan opened in 1943
Railway stations in Mie Prefecture
Stations of Kintetsu Railway
Matsusaka, Mie